The Chinese Puzzle is a British six-part children's adventure series, first broadcast on BBC1 in 1974.  It was the brainchild of prolific British television writer, Brian Finch, and features "two friends who stumble into a complex plot involving kidnapping and blackmail".

Episodes
The six episodes are:
"The Snatch"
"The Bullet"
"Camera Trick"
"Prisoners"
"Dead or Alive"
"Show Down"

References

External links 
 

BBC children's television shows
1970s British children's television series
1974 British television series debuts
1974 British television series endings